The discography of King Crimson consists of 13 studio albums, 15 live albums, 13 compilation albums, 3 extended plays, 10 singles, 6 video albums and 9 major box sets.

Albums

Studio albums

Live albums

King Crimson Collectors' Club

Collectable King Crimson

DGM Live

Additional releases along the lines of the Collector's Club are being made available at DGM Live. This is the new Discipline Global Mobile website including King Crimson/Robert Fripp news, online diaries from Robert Fripp and The Vicar, and ongoing releases available for download in MP3 and FLAC formats.

The releases include extensive King Crimson and Robert Fripp live recordings, in addition to some previously unreleased studio material. Since the launch of the site, some shows have been made available sometimes within days or weeks of the performance. It has been noted that the Collector's Club releases will eventually be made available as downloads on the site as well. As of 1 November 2007 there are 118 releases available at the site.

Notable Selections:
Jazz Club Chesterfield, England, September 07, 1969 (2010)
Fillmore East New York, N.Y., USA, November 21, 1969 (2006)
Armoury – Wilmington, Delaware, Feb. 11, 1972 (2008)
The Barn – Peoria, IL, March 10, 1972 (2011)
Apollo Glasgow, Scotland, October 23, 1973 (2006)
Stanley Theatre Pittsburgh, PA, April 29, 1974 (2009)
Penn State University University Park, Pennsylvania, June 29, 1974 (2007)
Park West Chicago, Illinois, August 07, 2008 (2008)

Compilation albums
Mostly studio recordings, some incorporating live recordings.

Major box sets
Mostly part of the '40th Anniversary Edition' release schedule – but major releases in themselves.

EPs
Mostly studio recordings, some incorporating live recordings.

Singles
Includes only singles released commercially, in various territories.Music videos were released for "Heartbeat" and "Sleepless".

Notes:

KC50
This series, released across 50 weeks of 2019, aims to document "rare or unusual tracks" from the DGM archive. Each release is accompanied by commentary from David Singleton.

Videos

ProjeKcts

See also
Robert Fripp discography

References

External links
 
 King Crimson Discography at Connolly & Company
 King Crimson Discography at Discogs

Discographies of British artists
Discography
Rock music group discographies